The following is the list of laws passed by the 15th Congress of the Philippines:

References 

+15th Congress
Presidency of Benigno Aquino III
History of the Congress of the Philippines